The International Peace Academy is a high school in Milwaukee, Wisconsin, operating as a charter school, primarily for Hmong American students. It was started in 2008 when the ninth grade was established, and it added another grade each year, with twelfth grade scheduled to be added in the 2011-2012 school year.

The Hmong American Peace Academy is an affiliated charter elementary school.

See also
 Hmong in Wisconsin

References

External links
 Hmong American Peace Academy Ltd.

High schools in Milwaukee
Hmong-American culture in Wisconsin
Charter schools in Wisconsin
Educational institutions established in 2008
Public high schools in Wisconsin
2008 establishments in Wisconsin